Andre Agassi defeated the defending champion Pete Sampras in the final, 4–6, 6–1, 7–6(8–6), 6–4 to win the men's singles tennis title at the 1995 Australian Open. Agassi was making his Australian Open debut. He would go on to win three more editions of the tournament in 2000, 2001, and 2003.

A memorable moment occurred in the quarterfinal match between Sampras and Jim Courier. Sampras had fought from a two-set deficit to level the match at 2–2. Shortly after winning the first game of the fifth set, Sampras was overcome with grief over his then-coach, Tim Gullikson. (Gullikson had suffered several seizures while touring with Sampras in Europe in late 1994. Shortly before Sampras' match against Courier, Gullikson had collapsed during a practice session after suffering another seizure, with tests proving inconclusive at Epworth Hospital and being flown home to Chicago for further tests.) During the fifth set of the match, Sampras retired to his chair and broke down in tears. When he returned, Courier offered to finish the match the next day. Sampras declined and then won the match. Gullikson was later diagnosed with inoperable brain cancer and died in May 1996.

Seeds
The seeded players are listed below. Andre Agassi is the champion; others show the round in which they were eliminated.

  Pete Sampras (final)
  Andre Agassi (champion)
  Boris Becker (first round)
  Goran Ivanišević (first round)
  Michael Chang (semifinals)
  Stefan Edberg (fourth round)
  Michael Stich (third round)
  Todd Martin (fourth round)

  Jim Courier (quarterfinals)
  Yevgeny Kafelnikov (quarterfinals)
  Wayne Ferreira (second round)
  Marc Rosset (first round)
  Andriy Medvedev (quarterfinals)
  Thomas Muster (third round)
  Magnus Larsson (fourth round)
  Richard Krajicek (second round)

Qualifying

Draw

Finals

Top half

Section 1

Section 2

Section 3

Section 4

Bottom half

Section 5

Section 6

Section 7

Section 8

External links
 Association of Tennis Professionals (ATP) – 1995 Australian Open Men's Singles draw
 1995 Australian Open – Men's draws and results at the International Tennis Federation

Mens singles
Australian Open (tennis) by year – Men's singles